The Last Campfire is a 2020 puzzle video game developed and published by Hello Games. It was released for iOS, Windows, PlayStation 4, Nintendo Switch and Xbox One on August 27, 2020.

Gameplay
The Last Campfire is a puzzle game. The player assumes control of a soul named Ember, who must solve various environmental puzzles to help fellow forlorn souls who have lost hope to find their purposes. As the player saves all the Forlorns in an area, new areas will be unlocked. As players progress, they would meet and assist various non-playable characters, who will give Ember new items for solving puzzles. Players can play the game in "explore mode", which removes most of the puzzles in the game.

Development
Hello Games is the game's developer. It was called a "Hello Games Short", which indicates the game's smaller scope, similar to the animated shorts produced by Pixar Animation. The game was created by three people: Steve Burgess, Chris Symonds, and James Chilcott. They had all previously worked at Frontier Developments and released LostWinds and its sequel, Winter of the Melodias. The game was largely inspired by folk tales and story books, including those written by Brian Froud. The game was developed primarily for Apple's mobile devices, as the team programmed the game's control with touch screens in mind.

The game was announced at The Game Awards 2018. It was released for Windows via the Epic Games Store, PlayStation 4, Nintendo Switch, Xbox One and iOS via Apple Arcade on August 27, 2020. Hello Games released an update on April 9, 2021, introducing more puzzles and the ability to read the Wanderer's Diary and replay puzzles.

Reception

The game received generally positive reviews upon release according to review aggregator Metacritic.

References

External links
 

Adventure games
Puzzle video games
Apple Arcade games
IOS games
PlayStation 4 games
Xbox One games
Nintendo Switch games
Single-player video games
Video games developed in the United Kingdom
Indie video games
Windows games
2020 video games